Zdeňka Baldová, born as Zdeňka Balašová, married Hilarová (20 February 1885 – 26 September 1958) was a Czech film actress. She appeared in more than 60 films between 1921 and 1958. Baldová is buried at the Vinohrady Cemetery.

Selected filmography
 The Inspector General (1933)
 Poslední muž (1934)
 Three Men in the Snow (1936)
 Morality Above All Else (1937)
 Lidé na kře (1937)
 Jiný vzduch (1939)
 Eva tropí hlouposti (1939)
 Arthur and Leontine (1940)
 Pacientka Dr. Hegla (1940)
 Auntie's Fantasies (1941)
 A Charming Man (1941)
 Valentin the Good (1942)
 Gabriela (1942)
 Rozina, the Love Child (1945)
 The Adventurous Bachelor (1946)
 Sign of the Anchor (1947)
 A Dead Man Among the Living (1949)
 Distant Journey (1949)
 Leave It to Me (1955)
 Focus, Please! (1956)

References

External links
 

1885 births
1958 deaths
Czech film actresses
Czech stage actresses
People from Česká Třebová